The Dahla Dam, also known as Arghandab Dam and Kasa, is located in the Shah Wali Kot District of Kandahar Province in Afghanistan, approximately  north of the provincial capital Kandahar. Constructed in 1952, it is said to be the second largest dam in Afghanistan. As of 2019, the Afghan government is spending $450 million on making the dam more useful. The project includes raising the dam's walls by 12 meters so its reservoir can hold nearly a billion cubic meters of fresh water and installing three turbines for the production of 22 megawatts (MW) of electricity.

Over the years its reservoir was subject to siltation, and its canal system reduced irrigation benefits. This necessitated undertaking rehabilitation of the dam which involved desiltation works and pertinent components of the project to improve the water delivery system; this component was completed during March 2012 with assistance provided by Canada. The second phase involved raising the height of the dam and the relevant dykes to compensate for the loss of storage in its reservoir due to siltation, and to achieve the full benefits of irrigation for which the dam was originally built.

History
The Dahla Dam was originally built between 1950 and 1952 when relations between Afghanistan and the United States were beginning to quickly develop. The purpose of the dam was to help farmers in Kandahar Province and provide clean drinking water to the city of Kandahar.

The Dahla Dam is an embankment structure made of earth and rock fill. To pass the design flood discharge two spillway structures have been built. To release water for irrigation to the canal system low level sluices have been built at the downstream toe of the dam with two control valves of the Howell-Bunger type which function as energy dissipation bypass valves.

The reservoir created by the dam has a storage capacity of 314 MCM. The contractor for the project was Morrison-Knudsen Afghanistan Incorporated. The dam and the irrigation system are under the control of the Helmand and Arghandab Valley Authority.

Rehabilitation and expansion

After completion of the dam in 1952, it functioned well for many decades. However, the irrigation system and its operation was neglected during the 1980s Soviet occupation. A technical appraisal of the status of the project carried out by experts from Agriculture and Agri-Food Canada in 2008 revealed that the siltation in the reservoir had resulted in reduction of the storage capacity by 34%, irrigation system had deteriorated resulting in loss in canal discharge to the extent of 70% on account of siltation, evaporation, seepage and other defects. The intake tower of the dam was not functioning properly and control valves were leaking, spillway capacity to discharge flood waters was inadequate, and there was no operational plan. Even before the rehabilitation of dam and canal system could be initiated, as first priority the mines in the rocky areas of the reservoir area had to be cleared which was done by the U.S. Army Corps of Engineers. After this operation, a two-phase rehabilitation plan was launched.

On completion of the rehabilitation works by raising the height of the dam and related appurtenant works and the improvements of the canal system the volume of available water would be increased from 300 million cubic meters to 484 million cubic meters, which would facilitate irrigation to command areas in the districts of Shah Wali Kot, Arghandab, Zheri, Panjwai, Maiwand, Dand and Daman and also help in planning and building a 10 MW capacity hydropower station to generate electricity.

Phase 1
In the first phase the rehabilitation works were carried out by Canada during the period from 2009 to 2012 under the project titled "Arghandab Irrigation Rehabilitation Project" at a cost of nearly $44 million US dollars.

Phase 2
Raising the height of the dam is seen crucial to increasing the volume of available water, which has reduced to around 290 million cubic meters from about 500 million cubic meters water. The work was initiated by the U.S. Army Corps of Engineers but then abandoned due to a financial issue with the Afghan government.

Phase 3
The third phase of the project was scheduled to be completed in 2024. In this regard, former deputy Minister of Energy and Water Abdul Basir Azimi stated the following: According to Toryalai Mahboobi, Kandahar basin chief, the reservoir of Dahla Dam would have 950 million cubic meters of fresh water after the third phase of the project is completed.

See also
 List of dams and reservoirs in Afghanistan

References

External links

 Satellite detected water extent and evolution, as of 04 March 2019 over Arghandab Dam, in Shah Wali Kot District, Kandahar Province, Afghanistan.
 Dahla Dam Irrigation Release (YouTube video by Bryan Construction Inc)
 US ARMY CORPS OF ENGINEERS & 77 CONSTRUCTION COMPANY DAHLA DAM IMPROVEMENT PROJECT PHASE 1 (YouTube video by U.S. Corps of Engineers)

Dams completed in 1952
Dams in Afghanistan
Helmand River drainage basin
Buildings and structures in Kandahar Province
1952 establishments in Afghanistan